Wetwang is a Yorkshire Wolds village and civil parish in the East Riding of Yorkshire, England,  west of Driffield on the A166 road.

At the 2011 census, it had a population of 761, an increase on the 2001 census figure of 672.

Toponymy
There are two interpretations of the name. One is from the Old Norse vaett-vangr, or 'field for the trial of a legal action'. Another theory is that it was the "Wet Field" compared to the nearby dry field at Driffield. It has frequently been noted on lists of unusual place names; in some varieties of English wang is a slang term for penis, although this sense of the word is not recorded in the Oxford English Dictionary.

History
St Nicholas' Church is of Norman origin and was restored between 1845 and 1902. In 1966, the church was designated a Grade II* listed building and is now recorded in the National Heritage List for England, maintained by Historic England. It is on the Sykes Churches Trail devised by the East Yorkshire Churches Group.

The village is known for its Iron Age chariot burial cemetery at Wetwang Slack, and was previously known for its black swans after which the village pub, the Black Swan, is named.
The village is mentioned twice in the Domesday Book as Wetuuangha. The lesser mention simply records its existence: "In Wetwang the archbishop  carucates". The mention is under "Warter Hundred" on original folio 381V: East Riding. A "plough" was a carucate which was being ploughed, rather than grazed or fallow. Before the Norman Conquest (TRE) Ealdraed held it, and it was worth £4 per year in rent, but after the conquest it was waste land held by Archbishop Thomas.

It has been hypothesised that the unlocated Romano-British town of Delgovicia is located at Wetwang.

Public transport
Until 1950, the village was served by Wetwang railway station, on the Malton to Driffield Line, but this line has closed. The village is now served by an infrequent East Yorkshire Motor Services bus.

Honorary mayor
Its name (defined in The Meaning of Liff as meaning "a moist penis") often attracts mirth, even from Richard Whiteley of the Channel 4 quiz show Countdown; he held the honorary title Mayor of Wetwang from 1998 until his death in 2005.
On 25 June 2006, local weather forecaster Paul Hudson from BBC Look North was invested as Whiteley's successor.

References

External links

Civil parishes in the East Riding of Yorkshire
Villages in the East Riding of Yorkshire